Indogermanische Forschungen (English: Indo-European Researches; subtitled Zeitschrift für Indogermanistik und historische Sprachwissenschaft/Journal of Indo-European Studies and Historical Linguistics) is an annual peer-reviewed academic journal of linguistics. It focuses primarily on Indo-European studies, but also publishes contributions on other languages and linguistic fields. It was established in 1892 by Karl Brugmann and Wilhelm Streitberg and published until vol. 37 (1916/17) by Verlag Karl J. Trübner. Starting with vol. 38 (1917/20) it has been published on an annual basis by Walter de Gruyter. Vols. 1–43 were supplemented with the Anzeiger für indogermanische Sprach- und Altertumskunde. Beiblatt zu den Indogermanischen Forschungen, a review journal edited by Streitberg.

The editors-in-chief are Benjamin W. Fortson (University of Michigan), Götz Keydana, Melanie Malzahn, Paul Widmer.

Abstracting and indexing
The journal is abstracted and indexed in Scopus, ERIH PLUS, and Linguistic Bibliography Online. According to the Journal Citation Reports, the journal has a 2021 impact factor of 0.462.

Editors
The following persons are or have been editors-in-chief of the journal:

References

External links  
 
Indogermanische Forschungen on archive.org
 Index of Indogermanische Forschungen 1-50 on archive.org

Indo-European linguistics works
Linguistics journals
Publications established in 1892
De Gruyter academic journals
Multilingual journals
Annual journals